Chongqing Tall Tower is a supertall skyscraper with 101 floors and with a roof height of  planned for Chongqing, China. The design has gone through several versions, requiring the demolition of the base for a previous version of the project, but the project was cancelled in December 3th 2022.

See also
List of tallest buildings in China
List of tallest buildings in Chongqing
List of buildings with 100 floors or more

References

 

Buildings and structures under construction in China
Skyscraper office buildings in Chongqing
Skyscrapers in Chongqing
Skyscraper hotels in Chongqing
Residential skyscrapers in China
Retail buildings in China